Fairfield is a town in Fairfield County, Connecticut, United States. It borders the city of Bridgeport and towns of Trumbull, Easton, Weston, and Westport along the Gold Coast of Connecticut. As of 2020 the town had a population of 61,512.

History

Colonial era 

In 1635, Puritans and Congregationalists in the Massachusetts Bay Colony, were dissatisfied with the rate of Anglican reform, and sought to establish an ecclesiastical society subject to their own rules and regulations. The Massachusetts General Court granted them permission to settle in the towns of Windsor, Wethersfield, and Hartford which is an area now known as Connecticut.

On January 14, 1639, a set of legal and administrative regulations called the Fundamental Orders was adopted and established Connecticut as a self-ruling entity.  By 1639, these settlers had started new towns in the surrounding areas. Roger Ludlowe, framer of the Fundamental Orders, purchased the land called Unquowa (presently called Fairfield), and established the name. The name "Fairfield" is commendatory.

According to historian John M. Taylor:

Towns created from Fairfield

Fairfield was one of the two principal settlements of the Connecticut Colony in southwestern Connecticut (the other was Stratford). The town line with Stratford was set in May 1661 by John Banks, an early Fairfield settler, Richard Olmstead, and Lt. Joseph Judson, who were both appointed as a committee by the Colony of Connecticut. The town line with Norwalk was not set until May 1685.

Over time, it gave rise to several new towns that broke off and incorporated separately. The following is a list of towns created from parts of Fairfield.
 Redding in 1767
 Weston in 1787
Easton, created from Weston in 1845
 Bridgeport in 1821 (also partly from Stratford) and again in 1870 when the Black Rock section left Fairfield
 Westport in 1835 (partly from Weston and Norwalk)

Revolutionary War

When the American Revolutionary War began in the 1770s, Fairfielders were caught in the crisis as much as, if not more than, the rest of their neighbors in Connecticut. In a predominantly Tory section of the colony, the people of Fairfield were early supporters of the cause for independence. Throughout the war, a constant battle was being fought across the Long Island Sound as Loyalists from British-controlled Long Island raided the coast in whaleboats and privateers. Gold Selleck Silliman, whose home still stands on Jennings Road, was put in charge of the coastal defenses.

In the spring of 1779, Silliman was kidnapped from his home by Loyalist raiders in preparation for a British raid on Fairfield County. His wife, Mary Silliman watched from their home as, on the morning of July 7, 1779, approximately 2,000 British troops landed on Fairfield Beach near Pine Creek Point and invaded the town; the force proceeded to burn Fairfield due to the town's support for Patriot cause. A decade later, President George Washington noted that after traveling through Fairfield that "the destructive evidence of British cruelty are yet visible both in Norwalk and Fairfield; as there are the chimneys of many burnt houses standing in them yet".

Twentieth century

The First World War brought Fairfield out of its agrarian past by triggering an unprecedented economic boom in Bridgeport, which was the center of a large munitions industry at the time. The prosperity accompanied a temporary housing shortage in the city, and many of the workers looked to Fairfield to build their homes. The trolley and later the automobile made the countryside accessible to these newly rich members of the middle class, who brought with them new habits, new attitudes, and new modes of dress. The prosperity lasted throughout the twenties.

By the time of the Wall Street Crash of 1929, the population had increased to 17,000 from the 6,000 it had been just before the war. Even during the Depression, the town kept expanding.

The grounding of a barge with two crewmen on Penfield Reef in Fairfield during a gale led to the 1st civilian helicopter hoist rescue in history, on November 29, 1945. The helicopter flew from the nearby Sikorsky Aircraft plant in Bridgeport, Connecticut.

Fairfield became the home of the corporate headquarters of General Electric (GE), one of the world's largest companies. On May 8, 2017, GE relocated to Boston, Massachusetts.

The opening of the Connecticut Turnpike in the 1950s brought another wave of development to Fairfield, and by the 1960s the town's residential, suburban character was firmly established.

Geography
The town is on the shore of the Long Island Sound. The Mill River, the waters of which feed Lake Mohegan, flows through the town.

Neighborhoods

Fairfield consists of many neighborhoods. The best known are wealthy Southport, where General Electric Chief Executive Officer Jack Welch lived for many years, and Greenfield Hill, with its large green areas, famous dogwood trees, and picturesque green with its white-spired Congregational church. Other neighborhoods include Stratfield, Tunxis Hill, the University area, Grasmere, Mill Plain, Knapp's Village, Melville Village, Holland Hill, Murray, and the Fairfield Beach area, which has recently undergone a renaissance with the construction of many new homes by residents wishing to live in proximity to the beach and downtown. This has resulted in steadily rising property prices. Two shopping districts in town include the Post Road (U.S. 1) and Black Rock Turnpike.

 Fairfield Center/Downtown Fairfield
 Fairfield Beach
 Grasmere
 Greenfield Hill
 Lake Hills
 Mill Plain
 Murray
 Sasco Hill and Beach
 Southport
 Stratfield Village
 Tunxis Hill

Demographics

As of the census of 2010, there were 59,404 people in the town, organized into 20,457 households and 14,846 families.  The population density was 1,927 people per square mile (744/km2). There were 21,648 housing units at an average density of 703 per square mile (277/km2).  The racial makeup of the town was 91.6% White, 3.7% Asian, 1.8% African American, 0.06% Native American, 0.01% Pacific Islander, 1.2% from other races, and 1.6% from two or more races.  5.0% of the population were Hispanic or Latino of any race.

There were 20,457 households, out of which 38.3% had children under the age of 18 living with them, 60.6% were married couples living together, 9.1% had a female householder with no husband present, and 27.4% were non-families. 22.3% of all households were made up of individuals, and 15.1% had someone living alone who was 65 years of age or older.  The average household size was 2.69 and the average family size was 3.19.

In the town, the population was spread out, with 25.4% under the age of 18, 11.1% from 18 to 24, 21.1% from 25 to 44, 27.4% from 45 to 64, and 15.1% who were 65 years of age or older.  The median age was 40 years.  For every 100 females, there were 90.5 males.  For every 100 females age 18 and over, there were 85.6 males.

The median household income (in 2013 dollars) was $117,705 (these figures had risen to $103,352 and $121,749 respectively as of a 2007 estimate). Males had a median income of $69,525 versus $44,837 for females. The per capita income for the city was $55,733.  2.9% of the population and 1.8% of families were below the poverty line.  Out of the total population, 2.8% of those under the age of 18 and 3.6% of those 65 and older were living below the poverty line.

Government and politics

Economy
In May 2012, Moody's Investors Service revised the Town of Fairfield's $192 million general obligation bond debt from negative to stable. In June 2012, Moody's awarded Fairfield with an AAA bond rating, which it maintains to this date.

Taxes
In 2005, the mill rate of Fairfield was 16.67. The 2012–2013 taxes in Fairfield rose 4% to a mill rate of 23.37. The 2013–2014 mill rate which went into effect on July 1 for fiscal year 2013–2014 also increased by 2.38% to 23.93.

Large and distinctive companies

 R.C. Bigelow (Bigelow Tea Company) – headquarters, Black Rock Turnpike
 Sturm, Ruger & Co. – headquarters, Lacey Place in Southport, firearms manufacturer
 Fairfield University – 1073 North Benson Road (5000 students and more than 500 academic employees plus additional administrators and staff)
 Sacred Heart University – New England's second largest Roman Catholic university

Points of interest

Historic sites 

 Connecticut Audubon Society Birdcraft Museum and Sanctuary – 314 Unquowa Road (added 1982)
 Bronson Windmill – 3015 Bronson Road (added 1971)
 David Ogden House – 1520 Bronson Road (added 1979)
 Fairfield Historic District – Old Post Road from Post Road to Turney Road (added 1971). This is the old town center of Fairfield, roughly along Old Post Road between U.S. Route 1 and Turney Road.  The area contains Fairfield's town hall, public library, and houses dating from the late 18th century.
 Fairfield Railroad Stations – Carter Henry Drive (added 1989)
 Greenfield Hill Historic District – Roughly bounded by Meeting House Lane, Hillside Road, Verna Hill Road and Bronson Road (added 1971)
 John Osborne House – 909 King's Highway West (added 1987)
 Jonathan Sturges House – 449 Mill Plain Road (added 1984)
 Pine Creek Park Bridge – North of Old Dam Road, over Pine Circle (added 1992)
 Southport Historic District – Roughly bounded by Southport Harbor, railroad tracks, Old South Road, and Rose Hill Road (added 1971)
 Southport Railroad Stations – 96 Station St. and 100 Center St. (added 1989)

Arts, entertainment, and sports
 The Regina A. Quick Center for the Arts on the campus of Fairfield University opened in 1990. Its schedule of events includes popular and classical music, dance, theatre, programs for young audiences, and the Open VISIONS Forum lecture series which feature opinion-makers, artists, authors, political commentators, and contributors to the humanities and sciences. The Quick Center houses the 740-seat Kelley Theatre, the 150-seat Lawrence A. Wien Experimental Theatre, and the Thomas J. Walsh Jr. Art Gallery. The Quick Center has become known as one of the finest concert halls in the country and was recognized as the "cultural epicenter of Fairfield County" by Westport Magazine.
 The PepsiCo Theatre, a renovated 1922 carriage house on the campus of Fairfield University, is the home to the theatre program of the Department of Visual and Performing Arts and Theater Fairfield, the resident production company of the university. The PepsiCo Theatre also hosts experimental productions by students, faculty and local professionals.
 The Bellarmine Museum of Art on the campus of Fairfield University hosts shows by regional artists and touring exhibitions as well as a permanent collection.
 The Gazebo on Sherman Town Green is home to free concerts during the summer in the afternoon hours.
 WSHU-FM Public Radio, operated by Sacred Heart University
 WVOF, student-run radio at Fairfield University
 Fairfield University hosts collegiate athletic competitions open to the public including basketball, baseball, cross-country, field hockey, lacrosse, rowing, soccer, swimming, tennis, and volleyball.

Parks and recreation

Fairfield residents enjoy a wealth of recreational opportunities, many of which stem from Fairfield's enviable location on the Long Island Sound.
 The town's  of Long Island Sound coastline include five town beaches which are staffed by lifeguards during the summer, and miles of privately owned beach which are open to the public below the high tide mark.
 South Benson Marina is a town-owned facility providing 600 boat slips which residents can rent for the summer.
 Lake Mohegan, which includes waterfalls called The Cascades, is a popular destination for hiking, as are the Fairfield Audubon Society and the Bird Sanctuary.
 Ye Yacht Yard, a town-owned facility on Southport Harbor, provides boat launch services to residents, and access to moorings in Southport Harbor.  Ye Yacht Yard is also the location of Community Sailing of Fairfield, whose members share use of two 18-foot sailboats.
 The "SportsPlex" is located in downtown Fairfield and offers athletic activities such as ice skating, indoor climbing, indoor soccer and gymnastics.

Other points of interest
 Fairfield Museum and History Center – displays on local history, art and decorative arts, and a library on local history
 Gallery of Contemporary Art at Sacred Heart University – holds five exhibitions each year
 Regina A. Quick Center for the Arts at Fairfield University

Government

The town government consists of the three-member Board of Selectmen, a Representative Town Meeting (RTM), a Board of Finance, a Board of Education, a Town Planning and Zoning Commission (TPZ), and many other politically appointed commissions, boards, and committees. The current First Selectman is Brenda Kupchick (R).

Makeup of notable governmental bodies 
As of November 22, 2021

Board of Selectmen 

Republican controlled 2–1

Representative Town Meeting 
Democrat Controlled 23–17

Board of Finance 
Democrat Controlled 5–4

*Special Election held in 2021 to replace the seat left vacant by Ed Bateson on 5/17/21

Board of Education 
Democrat Controlled 5–4

The town has no criminal or civil court system and all trials are held and handled by the Bridgeport Superior Court system. However, the town does also offer access to a Juvenile Review Board (JRB) for certain juvenile cases outlined by the Fairfield Police Department.

In the Connecticut General Assembly, Fairfield is represented by one Republican, Sen. Tony Hwang, and three Democrats, Rep. Cristin McCarthy Vahey, Rep. Jennifer Leeper, and Rep. Sarah Keitt.

Emergency services

Police Department
The Fairfield Police Department was created in 1926, approximately 287 years after the town was founded.

Fire Department
The town of Fairfield is protected by the 95 career firefighters of the Fairfield Fire Department (FFD), and volunteer firefighters of the Southport Volunteer Fire Department and Stratfield Volunteer Fire Department. The career Fairfield Fire Department operates five fire stations, located throughout the town, and uses a fire apparatus fleet of five engine companies, one ladder company, one rescue company, three fireboats, and 1 Shift Commander's Unit, as well as many special support, and reserve units. The Southport Volunteer Fire Department has served the community since 1895. The Stratfield Volunteer Fire Department has several stations and has served the community since 1920.

Education

Fairfield has two public high schools, Fairfield Warde and Fairfield Ludlowe; three public middle schools, Roger Ludlowe, Tomlinson, and Fairfield Woods Middle School; and eleven public elementary schools.

Fairfield has several Catholic schools, including two high schools, Fairfield Prep and Notre Dame, and two primary schools, St. Thomas Aquinas and Our Lady of the Assumption. A third Catholic primary school, Holy Family, was closed by the Diocese of Bridgeport at the end of the 2009–2010 academic year.

Non-religious private schools include Fairfield Country Day School and the Unquowa School.

Fairfield is also home to two post-secondary institutions, Fairfield University and Sacred Heart University.

Media
 Fairfield Online News
 Connecticut Post (headquartered in neighboring Bridgeport)
 Fairfield Minuteman
 Fairfield Citizen-News
 Fairfield Sun
 HamletHub Fairfield
 Fairfield Magazine
 Fairfield County Catholic
WVOF

Transportation

Fairfield is traversed by U.S. 1, Interstate 95, and the Merritt Parkway. It has three Metro-North Railroad stations, Fairfield Metro, Fairfield and Southport. The town is served by several public bus lines of the Greater Bridgeport Transit Authority.

Places of worship
 St. Anthony of Padua Church
 Church of the Apostles – Anglican
 Trinity Baptist Church
 Greenfield Hill Congregational Church – Congregational Church
 First Church Congregational – UCC
 Southport Congregational Church
 St. Paul's Episcopal Church – Episcopal Church (United States)
 St. Timothy's Episcopal Church – Episcopal Church (United States)
 Trinity Episcopal Church – Episcopal Church (United States)
 Fairfield Grace United Methodist Church – United Methodist Church
 Black Rock Congregational Church – non-denominational evangelical
 Kingdom Hall of Jehovah's Witnesses
 Our Saviour's Lutheran Church – Lutheran Church
 First Presbyterian Church of Fairfield – Presbyterian Church
 Holy Cross Roman Catholic Church
 Our Lady of the Assumption
 St. Pius X Church
 St. Thomas Roman Catholic Church
 Chabad of Fairfield
 Congregation Beth El

Notable people

 William Burnett Benton (1900–1973), former U.S. senator
 Leonard Bernstein (1918–1990), conductor, composer, musician
 James Blake (born 1979), professional tennis player
 Julius Boros (1920–1994), professional golfer, winner of 18 PGA tour events including the 1952 and 1963 U.S. Open and 1968 PGA Championship
 Aaron Burr Sr. (1716–1757), native, clergyman, educator, and father of Vice President Aaron Burr
 John Byrne (born 1950) comic book artist and author
 Ann Shaw Carter (1922–2005) first woman to be a commercial helicopter pilot
 Kenton Clarke (born 1951), CEO of Computer Consulting Associates, trumpet player, Buglers Hall of Fame and Drum Corps Hall of Fame
 Susan Cooper (born 1935) author of children's sequence The Dark Is Rising
 Hume Cronyn (1911–2003), actor, Lifeboat, Cocoon
 Michael J. Daly (1924–2008), World War II Medal of Honor recipient
 T. F. Gilroy Daly, attorney and federal judge, born in Fairfield
 C. Douglas Dillon, Secretary of US Treasury, ambassador to France, lived in Fairfield 
 David L. Downie, author and professor of politics and environment policy at Fairfield University
 Keir Dullea, actor, 2001: A Space Odyssey
 Dick Durrell (1925–2008), founder of People magazine, adjunct professor at Sacred Heart University
 Timothy Dwight IV (1752–1817), Congregationalist minister, author, president of Yale College; pastor for 12 years at Greenfield Hill Church
 Margaret Morrison, granddaughter of Andrew Carnegie
 Tatiana Foroud, internationally recognized genetic researcher
 Chris Frantz and Tina Weymouth, founding members of Talking Heads and Tom Tom Club
 Robert Greenberger (born 1958), writer, editor and Fairfield politician
 J. J. Henry, PGA golfer, 2006 Ryder Cup team member
 Paul Hogan, aka "Crocodile Dundee", actor, lived many years in Fairfield with wife Linda Kozlowski
 Don Imus, radio personality, past resident in Southport
 Eliot A. Jardines, Assistant Deputy Director of National Intelligence for Open source intelligence
 Oliver Burr Jennings, Exxon (Standard Oil) founder
 Pat Jordan, sportswriter and acclaimed author of A False Spring, ranked #37 on Sports Illustrated Top 100 Sports Books of All Time
 Linda Kozlowski, actress, born in Fairfield
 David LaChapelle, born in Fairfield, photographer and director
 Jonathan Lewis, biomedical researcher, cancer drug developer
 Justin Long, actor, Jeepers Creepers, Ed
 Roger Ludlow, town founder
 Pauline Bradford Mackie (1873–1956), writer of historical fiction
 Florence Lewis May, art historian
 John Mayer, Grammy-winning singer-songwriter and guitarist
 Bradley B. Meeker, Minnesota Territorial Supreme Court justice
 Brian Monahan, US Navy rear admiral and Attending Physician of the United States Congress
 Matt Morgan, professional wrestler, American Gladiator and actor
 Anne M. Mulcahy, chairman, Xerox Corporation
 Charles Nagy, former MLB pitcher for Cleveland Indians
 Joe Namath, New York Jets quarterback, Hall of Famer, past resident
 Henry Fairfield Osborn, (1857–1935) geologist, paleontologist, eugenicist
 Dan Remmes, actor/writer, book writer of Grumpy Old Men: The Musical
 Jason Robards, actor, lived in Southport
 Richard Rodgers, composer of more than 900 songs and 43 Broadway musicals, Rodgers and Hammerstein, Rodgers and Hart
 Philip Rubin, CEO emeritus of Haskins Laboratories and a former White House science adviser
 Meg Ryan, actress, Sleepless in Seattle, When Harry Met Sally..., born in Fairfield
 Chris Sarandon and Joanna Gleason, actors
 Gold Selleck Silliman, Revolutionary War general
 Samuel Smedley, privateer in Revolutionary War
 Howard Sosin, founder of AIG Financial Products, presently investor
 Jonathan Sturges, delegate to the Continental Congress and member of the United States House of Representatives
 Gene Tierney, actress, Laura, Leave Her to Heaven; attended Unquowa School in Fairfield
 Brian Torff, jazz musician, composer, head of Fairfield University music program
 Raviv Ullman, star of Phil of the Future
 Franco Ventriglia, opera singer, Fairfield native
 Jeffrey P. von Arx, president of Fairfield University
 Robert Penn Warren, author and poet
 Robert Waterman, clipper ship captain who sailed to California and named Fairfield, California after this city
 Michael Weatherly, actor, plays Special Agent Anthony DiNozzo in series NCIS
 Jack Welch, former CEO of General Electric, former town resident
 Bob Wright, chairman of NBC for 20 years
 Mabel Osgood Wright, author and founder of Connecticut Audubon Society (Birdcraft Museum in Fairfield)
 Julie Benko, actress; attended Fairfield Ludlowe High School in Fairfield

See also

Fairfield Community Connection

References

External links 

 

 
Towns in Fairfield County, Connecticut
Populated places established in 1639
Towns in the New York metropolitan area
Towns in Connecticut
Populated coastal places in Connecticut
1639 establishments in Connecticut